Aulacothorax melinus, the poison ivy leaf beetle, is a species of flea beetle in the family Chrysomelidae, formerly in the genus Orthaltica. It is found in North America.

References

Alticini
Articles created by Qbugbot
Beetles described in 1889
Taxa named by George Henry Horn